Nealla Gordon is an American actress. She has appeared in a number of Lee Daniels's productions, including films Precious (2009), The Paperboy (2012), and The Butler (2013). She portrayed the role of Harlow Carter on the first season of Fox prime time soap opera Empire in 2015. In 2017, Gordon was cast in the another Daniels's soap opera, Star playing villainous Arlene Morgan.

Career 
Gordon began her career in early 1990s, appearing on television shows include Thirtysomething, Doogie Howser, M.D. and Murphy Brown. Her other television credits include Touched by an Angel, Will & Grace, Desperate Housewives, NYPD Blue, and Grey's Anatomy. Gordon has a minor role portraying Nancy Kassebaum in The Butler.

Filmography

Film

Television

References

External links

Living people
Year of birth missing (living people)
American television actresses
21st-century American women